4426 is a 2016 Maldivian horror film written and directed by Fathimath Nahula and Ahmed Sinan. Produced by Sinan under Crystal Entertainment, the film stars Mariyam Azza, Yoosuf Shafeeu, Ismail Jumaih, Sheela Najeeb and Mohamed Jumayyil in pivotal roles. The film was released on 18 October 2016.

Cast 
 Mariyam Azza as Elisha
 Mohamed Jumayyil as Suja
 Ismail Jumaih as Hanim
 Yoosuf Shafeeu as Mifu
 Sheela Najeeb as Ruby
 Ibrahim Jihad as Muju
 Mohamed Faisal as Nihad
 Ali Farooq as Alibe
 Mariyam Shahuza
 Ahmed Aman
 Maahy as Zeena
 Mariyam Haleem as Ruby's mother

Development
4426 was announced on 26 February 2016. It was hyped in the media as the comeback film of Nahula after Yoosuf (2009) and for trying a different genre than her usual style. The script of the film took four months to be completed. The actors were trained in martial arts for two months before filming commenced.

Soundtrack

Release and reception
The teaser trailer of 4426 was released on 16 July 2016. Upon release, it received widespread recognition and acclaim, the teaser receiving over 200,000 views in a month, marking the first Maldivian film to reach that milestone.

The film was released on 16 October 2016. Upon release, the film received mostly positive reviews from critics. Ahmed Nadheem of Avas labelled the film as a "masterpiece" and praised Nahula's direction with Sinan's infused "technical quality" in the film. He further complimented Ibrahim Jihad's performance as an "award worthy performance". He concluded his review mentioning the team work and dedication of the film crew.

25 houseful shows of the film were screened at Olympus Cinema and it was declared as the highest grossing Maldivian film of the year.

Accolades

References

External links 
 

2016 films
2016 horror films
Maldivian horror films
Films directed by Fathimath Nahula
Films directed by Ahmed Sinan